Oriental Orthodox Christianity is represented in Burma by a church of the Armenian Orthodox Church, although reports of inscriptions in Greek dating back to the 13th century may indicate an earlier (now extinct) Orthodox presence in what is now Myanmar.

Armenian Orthodoxy in Burma
Whatever historical presence the Orthodox Church may have had, thanks to the large Armenian merchant community in Burma there were at one time four Armenian Orthodox churches in what is today Myanmar in the cities of Mandalay, Pegu, Syriam, and Yangon. The only active church today is St. John the Baptist's in Yangon under the jurisdiction of the Armenian Orthodox Church of Echmiadzin.

See also
Armenians in Burma

References

External links
Directory of the Armenian Orthodox Church of Echmiadzin in Asia and Oceania
St. John the Baptist Armenian Orthodox Church in Yangon

Christian denominations in Myanmar
Armenian Apostolic Church
Armenian diaspora in Asia